Juan Beltrán Guevara y Figueroa (1540 – 22 May 1622) was a Roman Catholic prelate who served as Archbishop of Santiago de Compostela (1603–1614), Archbishop (Personal Title) of Badajoz (1611–1615), and Archbishop of Salerno (1606–1611).

Biography
Juan Beltrán Guevara y Figueroa was born in Valencia del Ventoso, Spain.
On 4 December 1606, he was appointed during the papacy of Pope Paul V as Archbishop of Salerno. On 8 December 1606, he was consecrated bishop by Ottaviano Paravicini, Cardinal-Priest of Sant'Alessio. On 28 November 1611, he was appointed during the papacy of Pope Paul V as Archbishop (Personal Title) of Badajoz. On 12 January 1615, he was appointed during the papacy of Pope Paul V as Archbishop of Santiago de Compostela. He served as Archbishop of Santiago de Compostela until his death on 22 May 1622.

While bishop, he was the principal consecrator of Principal Consecrator of Jerónimo Ruiz Camargo, Bishop of Ciudad Rodrigo (1614), and Francisco González Zárate (de Gamarra), Bishop of Cartagena (1616).

References

External links and additional sources
 (for Chronology of Bishops) 
 (for Chronology of Bishops) 
 (for Chronology of Bishops) 
 (for Chronology of Bishops) 
 (for Chronology of Bishops) 
 (for Chronology of Bishops) 

17th-century Roman Catholic archbishops in Spain
1540 births
1622 deaths
Bishops appointed by Pope Paul V